Love (Swedish: Kärlek) is a 1952 Swedish drama film directed by Gustaf Molander and starring Sven Lindberg, Doris Svedlund and Victor Sjöström. It was shot at the Råsunda Studios in Stockholm. The film's sets were designed by the art director Nils Svenwall.

Cast
 Sven Lindberg as 	Einar Brandt, priest
 Doris Svedlund as 	Inga Tomasson
 Erik Strandmark as 	Anton Tomasson
 Victor Sjöström as 	Bishop
 Anders Henrikson as Sylvester Andreasson
 Hugo Björne as 	Andersson, parish clerk
 Gunnel Lindblom as 	Rebecka Andersson
 Kolbjörn Knudsen as 	Brandéus, dean
 Jarl Kulle as Wilhelm Andreasson
 Märta Dorff as 	Selma Danielsson
 Torsten Lilliecrona as 	Johan Johansson
 Jan Molander as 	Sofus, fisherman
 Axel Högel as 	Simon, fisherman
 Josua Bengtson as 	Fisherman
 Wiktor Andersson as 	Shoemaker
 Emmy Albiin as 	Hanna 
 Anders Andelius as 	Emrik Danielsson, Selma's son 
 Mats Björne as Member of boat's crew 
 Elsa Ebbesen as 	Ms. Mattsson 
 Mona Geijer-Falkner as 	Malin 
 Karin Högel as 	Woman at accident site 
 Börje Mellvig as 	Dr. Holm 
 Björn Montin as 	Olle, a boy in church 
 Björn Näslund as 	Rolf, member of the trawler's crew 
 Gösta Qvist as 	Man at accident site 
 Walter Sarmell as 	Member of the trawler's crew

References

Bibliography 
 Qvist, Per Olov & von Bagh, Peter. Guide to the Cinema of Sweden and Finland. Greenwood Publishing Group, 2000.

External links 
 

1952 films
Swedish drama films
1952 drama films
1950s Swedish-language films
Films directed by Gustaf Molander
Swedish black-and-white films
1950s Swedish films